Belloy may refer to:

People
 Jean-Baptiste de Belloy, Archbishop of Paris from 1802 to 1808
 Pierre-Laurent Buirette de Belloy, a French dramatist and actor

Places
 Belloy-en-Santerre, a commune of the Somme département, in France
 Belloy-Saint-Léonard, a commune of the Somme département, in France
 Belloy-sur-Somme, a commune of the Somme département, in France
 Belloy, Oise, a commune of the Oise département, in France
Belloy, Alberta, a hamlet in Alberta, Canada

Other
Belloy Formation, a stratigraphical unit in the Western Canadian Sedimentary Basin